The 2023 Intercontinental Cup (known as the 2023 Hero Intercontinental Cup for sponsorship reasons) will be the third edition of the Intercontinental Cup, a 4-team association football tournament held in 2023. The tournament is organized by the AIFF. 

India won the Inaugural 2018 Edition by Defeating Kenya in the Final by 2-0.

North Korea won the 2019 title by a 1–0 victory over Tajikistan in the final.

Participating nations 
The tournament will be played by teams from different confederations. The teams will play each other in a round robin phase and the top two teams will play the final.

Matches

References

International association football competitions hosted by India